Bio-Cancer are a thrash metal band from Athens, Greece, formed in late 2010.

History
Among their earliest releases was a contribution to the compilation album Thrash Or Be Thrashed Vol.2. They released their first album, Ear Piercing Thrash, in 2012 under Athens Thrash Attack Records, and their second album, Tormenting the Innocent, under Candlelight Records in 2015. A music video for "F(r)iends or Fiends", from Tormenting the Innocent, was released. While Metal Forces described Tormenting the Innocent as featuring a rather generic form of thrash metal, New Noise Magazine was much more favorable, awarding the album a perfect score and praising Bio-Cancer as one of the "cutting edge thrash metal bands". Brave Words & Bloody Knuckles and Stormbringer.at consider the band's style as not particularly innovative, but well-written. Venia Mag found the band energetic and technically precise but with a monotonous sound.
Bio-Cancer have toured with several popular metal acts such as Sodom, Onslaught, Rotting Christ, Xentrix, Artillery, and Marduk. The band's musical style has been compared to that of other underground Greek bands Flames, Acid Death, Suicidal Angels, and Insidead, as well as other bands such as Sodom, Kreator, Testament, and Shrapnel. Brave Words & Bloody Knuckles noted that Bio-Cancer mixes elements of Teutonic thrash metal with elements of Bay Area thrash metal, and that Lefteris uses some speed metal and black metal style vocals that add some variety to the band's sound. Metal.de compared Lefteris's vocals style to those of Chance Garnette of Skeletonwitch.

Discography 
 2012- Ear Piercing Thrash
 2013- "Dyers Eve" (Metallica Cover)
 2015- Tormenting The Innocent

Line-up 
 Giannis Lagoutaris- Bass/Backing Vocals
 Thanasis Andreou- Guitar
 Lefteris Hatziandreou- Vocals
 Stavros Marinos- Guitar/Backing Vocals
 Tomek Solomonidis- Drums

References

External links 
 Website

Thrash metal musical groups
Greek heavy metal musical groups
Musical groups established in 2010
2010 establishments in Greece